The fortifications of Paris in the 19th and 20th centuries comprise:
The Thiers Wall, surrounding the city of Paris, and farther from the city,
The detached forts and their complementary fieldworks.

They were built in two stages:
1840–1845: the Thiers Wall and the first ring of forts, about five kilometers from the city;
1874–1885: the second ring of forts, about twenty kilometers from the city.

From a military point of view, Paris is a fortified camp situated in a basin.  During the 19th century, both Prussian invasions (1814–15 and 1870) saw the bombardment of Paris from the surrounding heights.  Fortifications were extended outwards after each invasion as the range of artillery continued to develop, in order to deny the use of the heights to the enemy.

Chronology

Louis XIV 
1670 The king demolishes the walls of Charles V and Louis XIII. Paris becomes an open city and remains so for two centuries.

1689 Vauban recommends the enclosure of Paris, with the construction of a second enclosure to include the then-villages of Chaillot, Montmartre and Belleville (located on heights overlooking the city), and two citadels flanking the city to the east and west to delay an enemy's approach.

Louis XVI 

1784 The king orders the construction of the Farmers General Wall, built not as a fortification, but as a means of taxation.

Empire 
1814-1815 Paris is occupied twice at the end of the reign of Napoleon I.

First fortification program 

1818 Minister of War Laurent de Gouvion-Saint-Cyr creates a commission to "present its views on the best defense system" for Paris.

1820 The commission concludes that Paris must be placed in a state of defense, but proposes no specific project.

1830 Creation of a committee to study fortification which returns to the debate and again concludes that fortification is necessary, without consensus on how this is to be done.

1833 The defense plan for Paris envisages:
 The improvement of the Farmers General Wall (a tariff barrier) to a height of six meters, two ranges of crenelations and 65 towers or bastions;
 In advance of the Farmers General Wall, several delaying fortifications, along with a fortified line along the canal between Romainville and Saint-Denis, and a system of floodable areas around Saint-Denis;
 Ground works with casemates and star-shaped forts and redoubts on the heights between Saint-Denis and Nogent-sur-Marne; transformation of the Château de Vincennes into a modern fort. The works, carried out by General Éléonor-Zoa Dufriche de Valazé were often stopped and were not completed. In fact, two options worked in opposition:
 Option 1. A broad continuous enclosure that includes the suburbs in the defensive system, but not employing the Farmers General Wall. Valazé supports this scheme, a continuation of the plans of Vauban and François Nicolas Benoît, Baron Haxo.
 Option 2. The arrangement of the capital as a vast fortified camp, based on permanent forts occupying the principal positions while keeping a "containment shell" behind. Criticisms of this option relate to the insufficiency of the guarantee of defense: an enemy could easily penetrate between the obstacles, then engage the Farmers General fortifications.

1836 Creation of a commission on the defense of the kingdom.

1838 On July 16 a plan of defense is adopted, combining the two options in a show of unanimity.

1840 The Treaty of London excludes France.  Adolphe Thiers, considering that the new treaty includes the germ of a new invasion threat, seizes the occasion to commence the construction of the new fortifications. On September 1 General Guillaume Dode de la Brunerie is named director of the fortification program. The appointment and work is publicly announced on September 13.

1841 Over the reservations of the General Council of the Seine, 140 million francs are appropriated for the work, allocated, including 
17,970 million francs for land acquisition, 16,608 million francs for earthwork, and 83,356 million francs for masonry. The law authorizing work was promulgated by Louis-Philippe I on April 3, authorizing a continuous wall for both sides of the Seine, known as the Thiers Wall, supported by sixteen detached forts.

1845 Work is completed.

1860. The limits of the city of Paris are extended from the Farmers General Wall to the Thiers Wall, in accordance with the reorganization of the Paris urban fabric planned and executed by Georges-Eugène Haussmann.

Franco-Prussian War
July 1870 France declares war on Prussia, July 13.

September 1870 Napoleon III is captured at Sedan and capitulates.  A republic is proclaimed and the Prussians move toward Paris.  The capital is transformed into a fortified camp. A portion of the Thiers Wall gates are closed, along with canals and rail line entries. Houses are demolished in the designated  "zone 'non aedificandi" to clear lines of fire. The Prussians arrive on 19 September and establish a siege, which will last four months.

January 1871 On the 28th the Treaty of Versailles is signed, stipulating that all of the forts forming the perimeter defense of Paris, together with their armaments, be handed over to the German forces. The treaty further stipulates the disarmament of the Thiers Wall.

March 1871  The German army abandons the forts on the left (south) bank of the Seine.

20 September 1871 The German army abandons the forts on the right (north) bank of the Seine.

Second program of fortification 

During the 1870 war, the fortifications were relatively ineffective.

1874 On 17 July, a law inspired by the ideas of Séré de Rivières creates new programs for defensive works in the north and east of France, including some intended for the defense of Paris.

1885. The program is completed. 196 forts, 58 smaller works and 278 batteries are in place on the borders and at strategic points within France at an estimated cost of 450 million francs for the works and 229 million francs for their armament.

The removal of the Thiers Wall 
1883 On June 11 the municipal council of Paris votes to request the removal of the Thiers Wall, the property's transfer to the city and the end of restrictions on building in its vicinity.

1918 During World War I the Thiers Wall proves to be ineffective in the defense of Paris, as the range of German artillery such as the Paris Gun (120 km) renders walls irrelevant.

1919 On 19 April the city purchases the property for 100 million francs from the State of France. The city must purchase or expropriate the associated grounds and must maintain the "zone non aedificandi." Work begins on the demolition of the walls.

1925-1930 The "territoire zonier" is annexed to the city.

1930 A law is enacted to regulate the methods for compensation of the "zoniers."

The forts

Military doctrine for the employment of the forts 
The doctrines for the use of the forts depend on the context of the time. During the 19th century the roads were few. Armies were obligated to move along existing lines of communication in order to maintain their provisioning without resorting to dirt roads in unfavorable seasons. Therefore, a fortification located on an important road would be able to slow or stop a large troop formation. For example the Fort de Charenton was placed to dominate Route Nationale 6, the Paris-Geneva road, and Route Nationale 19, the road to Belfort, as well as the :fr:Pont de Charenton on the Marne and the :fr:Pont à l’Anglais on the Seine.

In wartime, the fort would fulfill several functions, in the manner of a fortified town. 
 The fort would provide a place of shelter for troops while passively resisting an assault by the enemy.
 If the enemy ignores the fort and circumvents it, they will be subject to attack from the rear by the fort's garrison, obliging a portion of the attacking forces to remain behind as protection.
 It is a point of concentration and protection for artillery
 It is a point of support for friendly forces

First ring of forts
The first ring of sixteen detached forts and complementary works, constituting the first line of defense a few kilometers from Paris, and supporting the Thiers Wall encircling Paris.

The sixteen forts

The sixteen forts built around Paris between 1840 and 1845 are shown in the following table.

The order described in the first column describes the forts in order as they appear as one proceeds clockwise around Paris (north-east-south-west). Forts are named for the communities they defended, not necessarily those in which they are located.

Complementary works

Second ring of forts 

This section includes those works completed between 1870 and 1890 as part of the Séré de Rivières fortifications, in the region of 20 kilometers from the capital.

Sources 
This page is a translation of its French equivalent.

See also 

 City walls of Paris
 Siege of Paris (1870–1871)
 City gates of Paris

References

Bibliography 
 Félix et Louis Lazare, Dictionnaire historique des rues et monuments de Paris en 1855 ; rééd. par Maisonneuve et Laroze, 1993, p. 132.
 Renaud Gagneux et Denis Prouvost, Sur les traces des enceintes de Paris, Parigramme, 2004.
 Jacques Hillairet, Dictionnaire historique des rues de Paris
 Guy le Hallé, Histoire des fortifications de Paris et leur extension en Île-de-France, Éditions Horvath, 1995.
 Guy le Hallé, « Sur les traces de l'enceinte du prieuré Saint-Martin-des-Champs », « La Ballade des Fortifs », in Paris aux cent villages, numbers 34 to 45.

External links 
 Les enceintes de Paris (with plan) 

 Guy Le Hallé, La saga des “fortifications” à Saint-Ouen  

 "La question des fortifications de Paris - 1840" Les chemins de mémoire (Ministere des Armees) 
 Association de sauvegarde du Fort de Villiers (ASFV), Les forts de la deuxième ceinture autour de Paris - Inventaire du devenir des 16 forts construits de 1870 à 1885, avril 200 :  
 Association Chelles Fortifs, Le système  Séré de Rivières en Île-de-France 

Geography of Paris
Paris-related lists
City walls in France
Fortifications of Paris
Séré de Rivières system
19th-century fortifications
20th-century fortifications